This is a list of programs formerly broadcast by the now-defunct children's television channel Qubo in the United States, a children's network which existed from January 8, 2007 until February 28, 2021.

Also detailed are Qubo-branded children's programming blocks which were carried by Ion Television and its subnetwork Ion Life/Ion Plus, NBC, and Telemundo. The Qubo blocks ended on the Ion networks on February 26, 2021, and on NBC and Telemundo on July 1, 2012.

Qubo channel

Former programming

Original programming

Acquired programming

Programming originally produced for and aired on PBS Kids

Interstitial programming

Blocks

Qubo-branded blocks

NBC

Original programming

Acquired programming

Short-form programming

Telemundo

Original programming
All programming utilized the Spanish-language dub.

Acquired programming

Short-form programming

Ion Television

Former programming

Original programming

Acquired programming

Short-form programming

Ion Life/Plus

Acquired programming

Short-form programming

References

External links

Qubo
Qubo